Kenosha County is located in the southeastern corner of the U.S. state of Wisconsin. The population was 169,151 as of the 2020 census, making it the eighth most populous county in Wisconsin. The county shares the same name as the city of Kenosha, the fourth largest city in Wisconsin. Kenosha County is part of the Chicago metropolitan area, the fourth most-populous metropolitan area in North America after the metro areas of Mexico City, New York, and Los Angeles. Kenosha County is situated on the southwestern shore of Lake Michigan.

In March 2008, the demographers of the Wisconsin Department of Administration reported that Kenosha County saw improvements in its roads and business's need for personnel. The county also has a direct rail link to Chicago via Metra's Union Pacific / North Line. Since 2000, the county saw a population increase of 12.6%, higher than the overall Wisconsin growth of 6.0%. According to Business Insider, Kenosha County is an exurb and benefits as part of the Chicago metropolitan area.

History
The Potowatomi inhabited the area that would become Kenosha County for centuries prior to the acquisition of the area in 1833. The city of Kenosha was founded in 1835, and Kenosha County was formed from Racine County on January 30, 1850. Its location led to development and factories being built in the 19th century. Manufacturing continued to be a key component of the economy into the 20th century.

Geography
Although the county contains area from Lake Michigan, it is the fourth-smallest county in Wisconsin by land area.

Major highways

  Interstate 41
  Interstate 94
  U.S. Highway 41 (Skokie Highway)
  U.S. Highway 45
  Highway 31 (Wisconsin)
  Highway 32 (Wisconsin)
  Highway 50 (Wisconsin)
  Highway 75 (Wisconsin)
  Highway 83 (Wisconsin)
  Highway 142 (Wisconsin)
  Highway 158 (Wisconsin)
  Highway 165 (Wisconsin)

Railroads
Canadian National
Canadian Pacific
Metra
Union Pacific
Kenosha station
Kenosha Streetcar

Buses
Kenosha Area Transit
List of intercity bus stops in Wisconsin

Airport
Kenosha Regional Airport (KENW) serves the county and surrounding communities.

Adjacent counties
 Racine County (north)
 Allegan County, Michigan (east)
 Lake County, Illinois (south)
 McHenry County, Illinois (southwest)
 Walworth County (west)

Demographics

As of the census of 2000, there were 149,577 people, 56,057 households, and 38,455 families residing in the county. The racial makeup of the county was 88.38% White, 5.08% Black or African American, 0.38% Native American, 0.92% Asian, 0.04% Pacific Islander, 3.29% from other races, and 1.91% from two or more races. 7.19% of the population were Hispanic or Latino of any race. 28.8% were of German, 10.4% Italian, 7.9% Irish, 7.6% Polish and 7.5% English ancestry.

There were 56,057 households, out of which 34.80% had children under the age of 18 living with them, 52.70% were married couples living together, 11.50% had a female householder with no husband present, and 31.40% were non-families. 25.50% of all households were made up of individuals, and 9.10% had someone living alone who was 65 years of age or older. The average household size was 2.60 and the average family size was 3.13.

In the county, the population was spread out, with 27.10% under the age of 18, 9.40% from 18 to 24, 31.30% from 25 to 44, 20.70% from 45 to 64, and 11.50% who were 65 years of age or older. The median age was 35 years. For every 100 females, there were 98.30 males. For every 100 females age 18 and over, there were 95.30 males.

In 2017, there were 1,873 births, giving a general fertility rate of 55.7 births per 1000 women aged 15–44, the 13th lowest rate out of all 72 Wisconsin counties.

Government

The county legislature is known as the Board of Supervisors. It consists of 23 members, each elected from single-member districts. The county executive is elected in a spring countywide, nonpartisan vote. The county executive is Samantha Kerkman. The district attorney, treasurer, clerk, and register of deeds are elected in fall countywide, partisan elections held in presidential years, while the sheriff and clerk of circuit court are elected in fall countywide, partisan elections held in gubernatorial years.

Politics
In presidential elections, Kenosha County has voted Democratic for most of the past century. In 2016, Donald Trump became the first Republican presidential candidate to win the county since President Nixon in 1972. Trump won it again in 2020, this time with an outright majority of the vote, marking the first consecutive victories for the GOP in Kenosha County since 1928.

Communities

City
 Kenosha (county seat)

Villages
 Bristol
 Genoa City (mostly in Walworth County)
 Paddock Lake
 Pleasant Prairie
 Salem Lakes
 Somers
 Twin Lakes

Towns
 Brighton
 Paris
 Randall
 Somers
 Wheatland

Census-designated places
 Lily Lake
 New Munster
 Powers Lake

Unincorporated communities

 Bassett
 Benet Lake
 Brighton
 Camp Lake
 Chapin
 Cross Lake
 Fox River
 Klondike
 Lake Shangrila
 Liberty Corners
 Paris
 Salem
 Salem Oaks
 Slades Corners
 Trevor
 Truesdell
 Voltz Lake
 Wilmot

Ghost towns/neighborhoods
 Aurora

See also

 National Register of Historic Places listings in Kenosha County, Wisconsin

Notes

References

External links

 
 Kenosha County map  from the Wisconsin Department of Transportation

 
1850 establishments in Wisconsin
Chicago metropolitan area
Populated places established in 1850